Neriene litigiosa, the sierra dome spider, is a species of sheet weaver spider in the family Linyphiidae. It is found in North America and has been introduced into China. This species complex mating system has been under study since 1980 at The University of Montana's Flathead Lake Biological Station by Dr. Paul J. Watson.

References

Linyphiidae
Articles created by Qbugbot
Spiders described in 1886